Gyula Kovács (28 August 1917 – 11 October 1986) was a Hungarian wrestler. He competed at the 1948 Summer Olympics, the 1952 Summer Olympics and the 1956 Summer Olympics.

References

External links
 

1917 births
1986 deaths
Hungarian male sport wrestlers
Olympic wrestlers of Hungary
Wrestlers at the 1948 Summer Olympics
Wrestlers at the 1952 Summer Olympics
Wrestlers at the 1956 Summer Olympics
Sportspeople from Bács-Kiskun County
20th-century Hungarian people